27 Cygni is a subgiant star in the northern constellation of Cygnus. It is faintly visible to the naked eye with an apparent visual magnitude of 5.38. At that distance, the visual magnitude is diminished by an extinction of 0.05 due to interstellar dust.

27 Cygni is a G-type subgiant with a stellar classification of G8.5 IVa, a star that has used up its core hydrogen and is starting to expand. It was found to be slightly variable by Percy et al. (1986), changing by up to 0.05 in visual magnitude with a characteristic time scale of 50–60 days. Further observations suggested a possible rotation period of around 42 days. Samus et al. (2017) classify it as a suspected RS Canum Venaticorum variable, meaning that it is a close binary star whose components have star-spots that cause rotationally-modulated variations in brightness. It has been given the variable star designation V2008 Cygni.

27 Cygni is listed in multiple star catalogues with three faint companions within one arc-minute. The two closer ones are unrelated background objects, while the third has a similar distance and space motion and is described as a common proper motion companion.

References

G-type subgiants
RS Canum Venaticorum variables
Cygnus (constellation)
Cygni, b1
Cygni, 27
Durchmusterung objects
191026
099031
7689
Cygni, V2008